Tad (often styled as TAD) was an American rock band from Seattle, Washington, formed in 1988 by Tad Doyle. They are often recognized as one of the first bands of the grunge era.

History

Formation and Sub Pop years (1988–1991)
Led by Tad Doyle (born Thomas Andrew Doyle) on vocals and guitar, Tad was formed in early 1988 by Doyle, a drummer turned guitar player/singer, who asked bassist Kurt Danielson to play bass for the band. Danielson's band Bundle of Hiss played with Doyle's previous band (in which he played drums) H-Hour. Doyle recruited drummer Steve Wied (formerly of Skin Yard) and guitarist Gary Thorstensen to complete the original line-up. Tad was among the first bands to be signed to the independent label Sub Pop Records. In 1988, Doyle had released the "Daisy/Ritual Device" single on Sub Pop, produced by seminal Seattle producer Jack Endino, for which Doyle wrote and performed all the music. Tad's debut album God's Balls appeared in early 1989, and was also produced by Endino. In March 1990, the band released Salt Lick, recorded by Steve Albini. The vinyl was a six-track EP and it was later expanded into a full-length with nine tracks once it was issued on CD. It contained the song "Wood Goblins", for which a music video was produced. After a European tour with Nirvana, Tad returned to Seattle and recorded their third album 8-Way Santa (1991), named after a type of blotter acid. Produced by Butch Vig, the album was far more pop-oriented than its predecessors, and featured the singles "Jinx" and "Jack Pepsi". 

"Jack Pepsi" was released as a single, but Pepsi filed a lawsuit against the band due to the cover art on the single, which was the Pepsi logo with "Tad" in place of "PEPSI". Another lawsuit was filed due to the cover of 8-Way Santa (which was a found picture of a man fondling a woman's breast). The couple in the photograph, one of whom had since become a born-again Christian and remarried, took exception and sued. Sub Pop subsequently changed the album cover to a shot of the band.

Major label years, turmoil and breakup (1992–1999)
After a very brief acting stint in Singles, Tad was offered its first major-label opportunity by Warner Music Group's Giant Records. However, Steve Wied had left, joining Willard, and later Foil. Rey Washam (formerly of Scratch Acid) briefly filled on drums in 1991, but was later replaced by Josh Sinder, previously of The Accüsed. Sinder debuted with Tad on their last Sub Pop release, the "Salem" / "Leper" single (which featured "Mud-Man", Josh's apparently mumps-afflicted brother, on the cover). Their major label debut, Inhaler, appeared later in the year to positive reviews. The record failed to break the band, however, even though they were chosen to open for Soundgarden on their 1994 Superunknown tour. Giant Records dropped the band when a poster promoting Inhaler surfaced featuring Bill Clinton smoking a joint with the caption reading "It's heavy shit".

In 1995, the band released Live Alien Broadcasts on Futurist Records, which was a best-of live studio recording. Thorstensen left the band but Tad secured a second major-label deal with East West/Elektra Records, another Warner label, in 1995. The same year, they released their final album Infrared Riding Hood. However, within a month of the release, the band's A&R representative was fired. As a result of that representative's termination, all of their signed bands were released and their albums ceased production, regardless of content. They continued to gig for the remainder of the year before Sinder left to form the Hot Rod Lunatics. He was replaced on drums by Mike Mongrain of Foil. Tad's final single "Oppenheimer's Pretty Nightmare" / "Accident on the Way to Church" appeared in 1998 on Up Records. A year later, the band dissolved.

Post-breakup (2000–2012)
Following Tad's breakup, Doyle formed Hog Molly in 2001 with Willard bassist Ty Garcia and 50 Paces guitarist Martin Chandler, releasing the album Kung-Fu Cocktail Grip late the same year. Willard guitarist Mark Spiders had recommended Ty, and Martin in a conversation with Doyle. Hog Molly then broke up and its members other than Doyle formed a band called The Ones. 

Doyle later formed the band Hoof. His other band Brothers of the Sonic Cloth has been playing in Seattle night clubs. Kurt Danielson went on to form Valis, a project that included members of Screaming Trees and Mudhoney. He also formed The Quaranteens, a post-punk/new wave band with Craig Paul, before moving to France. He is back in Seattle since 2008, and has started to write a novel. Danielson has also played in other local Seattle-based bands including Misericords (with fellow ex-Tad member Mike Mongrain on drums) and Vaporland (featuring ex members of Love Battery and The Fluid). Josh Sinder has gone on to play drums in The Insurgence and also plays with Marky Felchtone from Zeke in new band Hellbound For Glory.

A documentary of the band titled Busted Circuits and Ringing Ears was released in February 2008. In July 2009, taddoyle.com announced plans by Brothers of the Sonic Cloth to release a split 10" vinyl record with Seattle-area sludge metal band, Mico de Noche. The Brothers of the Sonic Cloth/Mico de Noche split 10" vinyl record was released in October 2009 as an edition of 500 copies and featured two songs by Mico de Noche and one song by Brothers of the Sonic Cloth, "Fires Burn Dim in the Shadows of the Mountain". The record received several positive reviews and appeared on Seattle Weekly's list of that year's best local releases.

In 2009, Tad Doyle performed with the members of Soundgarden and Tom Morello of Rage Against the Machine in Seattle. Chris Cornell, the original singer, was not present and Doyle took on vocal duties. This marked the first performance by Soundgarden in over a decade.

Partial reunion and aftermath (2013–present)
A semi-reunion of Tad took place at the Sub Pop Records 25th anniversary show on July 13, 2013 in Seattle, Washington. There, Tad Doyle and Gary Thorstensen joined Brothers of the Sonic Cloth to play a set of songs from God's Balls, Salt Lick and 8-Way Santa.

Kurt Danielson went on to play with Ron Nine and Kevin Whitworth (Love Battery) and Garret Shavlik (ex-the Fluid) for a self-produced album, Vaporland, in 2014. He and Ron Nine then played in Purple Strange with Jared Stroud, Matthew Candenberghe and Jack Endino, and issued another self-produced album of the same name in 2021.

A vinyl-only archival album, Quick and Dirty, was released in April 2018 as part of Record Store Day, and contains rare and unreleased tracks Tad recorded between 1995 and 1999.

Legacy
In 2017, Metal Injection ranked Tad at number 5 on their list of the "10 Heaviest Grunge Bands".

Band members
 Tad Doyle – vocals, guitar (1988–1999)
 Gary Thorstensen – guitar (1988–1994)
 Kurt Danielson – bass (1988–1999)
 Steve Wied – drums (1988–1991)
 Rey Washam – drums (1991)
 Josh Sinder – drums (1992–1996)
 Mike Mongrain – drums (1996–1999)

Timeline

Discography

Studio albums
 God's Balls (1989) Sub Pop
 Salt Lick (1990) Sub Pop
 8-Way Santa (1991) Sub Pop 
 Inhaler (1993) Giant/Warner Bros. Records
 Infrared Riding Hood (1995) East West/Elektra Records

Live albums
 Live Alien Broadcasts (1995) Futurist Records

Compilation albums
 Salt Lick/God's Balls (1990) Sub Pop
 Quick and Dirty (2018) Incineration Ceremony Recordings

Extended plays and singles
 Daisy/Ritual Device (1988) Sub Pop
 Damaged I (1989) Sub Pop Records (split w/ Pussy Galore)
 Wood Goblins/Cooking With Gas (1989) Glitterhouse Records
 Loser/Cooking with Gas (1990) Sub Pop 
 Jinx/Pig Iron (1990) Sub Pop 
 Jack Pepsi/Eddie Hook (1991) Sub Pop 
 Salem/Welt/Leper (1992) Sub Pop 
 Lycantrope/Just Bought the Farm (1992) Pusmort Records
 Leafy Incline/Pale Corkscrew (1993) Giant/Warner Bros. Records
 Dementia (1995) East West/Elektra Records
 Red Eye Angel/Bludge (1995) East West/Elektra Records
 Obscene Hand/Kevorkian's Holiday (1997) Amphetamine Reptile Records
 Oppenheimer's Pretty Nightmare/Accident On the Way to Church (1998) Up Records

Compilation and soundtrack appearances

 Sub Pop 200 (1988) Sub Pop – "Sex God Missy"
 Sub Pop Rock City (1989) Glitterhouse Records – "Sex God Missy"
 Crunchhouse (1989) Glitterhouse Records – "Behemoth"
 Dope, Guns 'N Fucking in the Streets, Vol. 1–3 (1989) Amphetamine Reptile Records – "Habit & Necessity"
 Fuck Me I'm Rich (1990) Sub Pop – "Ritual Device" and "Daisy"
 The Grunge Years (1991) Sub Pop – "Stumblin' Man"
 Revolution Come 'N' Gone (1992) Sub Pop – "Jinx"
 Mesomorph Enduros (1992) Big Cat Records – "Pig Iron"
 1989-1993: The John Peel Sub Pop Sessions (1993) Sub Pop – "Helot"
 Brainscan Original Motion Picture Soundtrack (1994) Ruffhouse Records – "Grease Box"
 Insanity (1994) Sony Music Entertainment – "Luminol"
 Bite Back: Live at the Crocodile Cafe (1996) PopLlama Records – "Just Bought the Farm" (live)
 Hype! The Motion Picture Soundtrack (1996) Sub Pop – "Giant Killer"
 Up Next: The Up Records Compilation (1998) Up Records – "Oppenheimer's Pretty Nightmare"

Guest appearances
 Willard [The Sound of Fuck]-(1992) Steel Mill [RoadRunner Records] Tad Doyle - Backing Vocals on "Stain"

See also
 Bundle of Hiss
 Hog Molly

References

Other sources
 Steve Huey, Tad biography on Yahoo! Music

External links
 Official website
 Tad; 1991 Video Archive; Live at The Masquerade; Atlanta, Georgia

Alternative rock groups from Washington (state)
American grunge groups
Heavy metal musical groups from Washington (state)
Sub Pop artists
Up Records artists
Musical groups from Seattle
Musical groups established in 1988
Musical groups disestablished in 1999
Musical groups reestablished in 2013
Musical groups disestablished in 2013
American alternative metal musical groups
Hardcore punk groups from Washington (state)